The Student Osteopathic Medical Association (SOMA) is a national, not-for-profit osteopathic medical organization founded to ensure a high quality of education for osteopathic medical students, to promote unity within the osteopathic medical profession, and to improve the delivery of healthcare by  Doctors of Osteopathic Medicine (D.O.) SOMA is the student affiliate organization of the American Osteopathic Association and works with all chapters to foster communication between government at the local and national levels and the osteopathic medical profession. 

The organization also awards scholarships annually to osteopathic medical students who demonstrate leadership, compassion, or exceptional dedication to addressing the medically underserved, political activism, international medicine, or public health. Pre-SOMA is a branch of the organization dedicated to the education of undergraduate pre-medical students about the osteopathic medical profession to aid them in the medical school selection process.

References

External links
Student Osteopathic Medical Association website

Non-profit organizations based in Chicago
Medical and health professional associations in Chicago
Osteopathic medical associations in the United States
Student organizations in the United States